Mary Mary is the third studio album by American duo Mary Mary. It was released by Columbia Records on July 19, 2005 in the United States, selling 57,000 copies in its first week. In 2006, the album won a Dove Award for Contemporary Gospel Album of the Year at the 37th GMA Dove Awards.

Critical reception 

David Jeffries from AllMusic gave Thankful a four out of five stars rating. He wrote that "blessed with wonderful voices, poignant songwriting skills, and a keen eye for which producers to work with, Mary Mary are a triple-threat who have delivered one exciting album after another. Raising the contemporary gospel bar once again, Mary Mary deserves your attention." Cross Rhythms writer Mike Rimmer found that "the girls are back with their best album yet. Always blessed with strong songwriting and vocal talents, they've refused to compromise the message and this release is packed with excellent stuff and a few surprises."

Track listing 

Samples
 "Heaven" contains excerpts from "Want Ads"/"We Belong Together" by Honey Cone. 
 "Save Me" contains excerpts from the composition "Save Me Now".

Charts

Weekly charts

Year-end charts

Certifications

References

2005 albums
Columbia Records albums
Mary Mary albums
Hip hop soul albums